"New Adam, New Eve" is the tenth episode of the second series of Space: 1999 (and the thirty-fourth episode overall of the programme). The screenplay was written by Terence Feely; the director was Charles Crichton. The final shooting script is dated 29 April 1976. Live action filming took place Wednesday, 2 June 1976 through Friday 18 June 1976.

Story 
It is 1095 days after leaving Earth orbit, and Moonbase Alpha is in turmoil. Hours ago, all sensor equipment suddenly began behaving erratically, indicating an intense magnetic turbulence lying directly ahead. As the Moon approaches, this turbulence is visualised as a frenetic blur of churning lights (through which one can catch almost subliminal glimpses of an unidentifiable celestial body). The staff experience attacks of vertigo, and one woman passes out. Helena Russell's examination shows her vital signs are weak; a quick check of the others reveals similar results.

The turbulence suddenly subsides, replaced on the big screen with a psychedelic light-show. Accompanied by a soothing, ethereal chorus, the display is mesmerising. It soon ends, fading to reveal a robed figure striding across space toward them. The Being announces He is their Lord and Creator, come to pay them a visit. With a rush of wind, this self-proclaimed Supreme Being materialises in Command Centre. Smiling benevolently, he absolves them of having to prostrate themselves in His presence.

Claiming that Earth's conflicting religions have 'distorted their beliefs' with the worship of 'false gods,' he declares himself to be the genuine article. A sceptical John Koenig treads cautiously, conceding He resembles an artist's rendition of God. Confronted with the 'divine' manifestation of banquet tables and comely serving girls, Koenig acts unimpressed. But the Commander's tone becomes flippant, and the Being wrathfully responds with a less-benign demonstration of His power—the stand-by Eagle being instantly reduced to slag.

Having gotten their attention, Magus (as the Being calls Himself), tells Koenig and company He is here to help. After humanity's mistreatment of Earth, He has come to give them a second chance—by guiding them to a new Eden, where Mankind can begin anew. Magus manipulates the big screen, bringing up a visual of an exquisitely beautiful planet—New Earth, the body which was hidden by the turbulence. Computer reveals the planet to be one-quarter Earth's size and with a compatible environment. Magus suggests a team visit the surface, choosing Koenig, Helena, Maya and Tony Verdeschi.

Annoyed by the divine posturing, Koenig tries to protest, but Magus is adamant—these four or no one. The Commander gives in, but insists they travel by Eagle. However, after the team boards Eagle Four, it is instantaneously transported to New Earth. Koenig tries to check-in with Alpha, but cannot make contact; Magus suggests His power of transport may have temporarily affected communications. They disembark into a lush, fertile meadow. The air is clean, the soil rich, the water pure, and fruit trees and the soya bean grow wild. Magus declares it the Garden of Eden, Mark II.

When Koenig proposes bringing down a task force to study the entire planet, Magus drops a bombshell:  no one else will be coming down. The four of them are to be His new Adams and Eves. Magus tells them they will live here in Paradise under his beneficence, bringing forth a new and improved species of Mankind. The Moon will orbit the planet for a time, then be sent on its way. Koenig draws his stun-gun, only to have it materialise in Magus's hand. Turning it on Himself, Magus fires and absorbs the full force of the laser discharge. Unharmed, He returns the weapon to Koenig.

After blessing them on this first day of Creation, Magus gets down to practical matters. The four are stunned when informed of their new pair-bonding arrangements. Maya will be Koenig's mate, hoping this interplanetary mix will interbreed her iron intellect with his iron will. Helena will be paired with Verdeschi, blending her natural aristocratic traits with his Italian earthiness. Though aware of their preexisting relationships, He wants to explore a different mix of genetic traits. When the Alphans argue these arbitrary pairings could be both psychologically and biologically harmful, Magus blithely dismisses their protests.

It is late afternoon and, with a sidelong glance at the setting sun, Magus makes one final decree:  they are not to leave the glade. Its boundary is clearly marked by boulders. Before dematerialising, He slyly remarks the Moon's light should have all the romantic qualities it did on old Earth. Koenig leads his people toward the Eagle, which promptly vanishes. Maya realises it is the victim of atomic dispersal—the ship is still there, but non-cohesive (like powder dissolved in liquid). Verdeschi asks the big question: is Magus really God?  While powerful, His motivations seem less than divine...

With no word from Koenig, Alan Carter decides to take an Eagle down to New Earth. The engines ignite, but the ship cannot achieve lift-off—as though some great force is holding it down. On the planet, the four discover Magus has effectively paired them off by encasing the couples in magnetic-field cocoons of opposing charges. Verdeschi can only touch Helena, and Koenig only Maya. As the night progresses, so do Magus's plans. Moonlight and romantic music—in conjunction with a powerful aphrodisiac-like influence—have the Alphans on the verge of consummating their new relationships.

The mood is suddenly shattered by an unearthly howling. Leaving the glade, they find a malformed, semi-humanoid being taking a horrible beating from an alien anthropoid. Koenig shoots the ape, only to have its mate leap from the bushes and attack Helena. The men cannot get a clear shot at it, and Maya transforms into an agile alien creature to rescue her. Moving to follow the humanoid as it shambles into a cave, they are stopped by a lightning strike mere metres away. Magus's face looms in the heavens, driving them back to the glade with a fusillade of lightning bolts fired from His eyes.

The next morning, they wake to find Magus standing over them, chastising them for their disobedience. Koenig demands to be told the truth about the life-forms seen last night. Magus evades the question, citing their acts of defiance as ingratitude. When Koenig rebuts He has taken away their free will, Magus scoffs that 'free-will' is a narcissistic illusion. Rebelling, Koenig walks toward the boundary—but is repelled by a powerful force-field. This is for their protection, Magus proclaims; though He can ill-afford the energy, it will remain up as long as they continue to act like children.

After Magus leaves, Maya announces that, despite appearances, His abilities are not psychic. She surreptitiously scanned Him and detected a potent power source in His body, mechanical in nature. Recalling His comment about being able to 'ill-afford' energy, they reckon Magus has His hands full. He is maintaining the force-field, preventing a rescue mission from Alpha—and, Maya interjects, holding the planet together. Magus must be countering the gravitational force of the Moon (which is much closer and larger in relation to this planet than it was to Earth); otherwise, the planet would break apart under the strain. They test the force-field and discover it does not extend above the treetops. As an owl, Maya flies out of the glade to gather information.

Carter has his Eagle equipped with booster rockets to increase the force of take-off. As the astronaut overloads his engines, Magus is seen on New Earth sweating with the effort of preventing the lift-off. When Carter gives up, Magus basks in the sunlight, seemingly rejuvenated. Maya returns and reports that, as the owl, she encountered Magus—who did not detect her true identity. She also saw tracks inside the boundary of their glade that could belong to the humanoid. They explore and find a second, deliberately blocked cave opening. They blast it open, hoping it joins up with the other cave.

Once inside, they are attacked by giant reptiles, which are fortunately susceptible to laser fire. Immediately after, Koenig is jumped by the humanoid mutant. The pitiful being was hoping to be shot...to end its miserable existence. It informs them Magus is the last of a race of cosmic magicians, who performed 'miracles' through physics. He wants to learn the secret of creation. The mutants are descendants of other species brought here for experimental breeding and genetic engineering. They intentionally fight the apes, hoping to be killed. Magus, however, will not let them die; the would-be god feels there may be something to learn from their mutilated DNA. These caves are a sanctuary, as he never comes here.

The mutant directs them to the exit. Outside, they encounter a vengeful Magus, who smites Verdeschi with a bolt of energy. As Helena tends to the security chief, the others berate this false god—for his deception and his intention of using them like laboratory animals. He denies their accusations—he admires humanity and has walked among them as Simon Magus, Merlin and Nostradamus among others. After breeding a superior strain of Mankind, he will endow them with his powers, then together solve the mystery of creation as a team. Koenig refuses, and Magus begins taking pot-shots at Moonbase to coerce him. To stop the attack, Koenig agrees to discuss his proposal.

It is sunset and Magus, rather than press home his advantage, hastily departs; the discussion will resume tomorrow. Koenig comes to the realisation Magus is afraid of the dark. He refuses to enter the caves, and always leaves before nightfall; the one time they saw him at night was a projection in the sky. When he shot himself with the laser, he drew strength from it. Maya concludes the mechanical implant she detected in Magus must be a light decelerator, a device that slows light from 186,000 miles per second down to zero. The energy differential provides unlimited power and can be directed simply by thought. As his power is derived from light, to defeat him they must isolate him from the sun.

Finding a deep narrow fissure, they attack the sides with makeshift tools to widen it into a proper tiger pit. Then, they weave mats out of branches and leaves to camouflage the hole. By dawn, they have finished. Koenig climbs down to test its effectiveness and finds himself in pitch-black darkness. After sunrise, Magus materialises. Koenig positions himself on the opposite side of the pit and deliberately provokes an argument. Magus stalks toward him and, as planned, falls through the flimsy covering. As the Alphans cover the resulting hole, Magus cries out for light...or else they are all doomed.

As predicted, the Moon's gravity begins pulling the planet apart. Gale-force winds rip through the glade as the ground heaves. Koenig is calling Alpha when the Eagle reappears in solid form. He sends the others to the ship and makes his way to the caves and offers to transport the humanoid mutant. With dignity, the mutant declines, preferring to end his life. Koenig boards the Eagle and lifts-off as the terrain crumbles away beneath it. Flying back to the Moon, they watch 'New Earth' break apart. They figure the chances of Magus escaping are not nil—if exposed to even the smallest ray of light as the ground broke up, he could have gotten away...

Cast

Starring 
Martin Landau — Commander John Koenig
Barbara Bain — Doctor Helena Russell

Also starring 
Catherine Schell — Maya

Featuring 
Tony Anholt — Tony Verdeschi
Nick Tate — Captain Alan Carter

Guest star 
Guy Rolfe — Magus

Also featuring 
 Bernard Kay — Humanoid Mutant
 Albin Pahernik — Maya/Creature
 Annie Lambert — 1st Operative (Julie Tracy)
 Barbara Wise — Beautiful Girl
 Yasuko Nagazumi — Yasko

Uncredited artists 
 Robert Reeves — Peter Reeves
 Terry York — Alien Ape

Music 

The score was re-edited from previous Space: 1999 incidental music tracks composed for the second series by Derek Wadsworth and draws primarily from the scores of "The Metamorph" and "The Taybor". During the 'night of romance' on New Earth, an arrangement of 'How Beautiful Is Night' composed by Robert Farnon in 1947 is used as Magus's mood music.

Production notes 

 The shooting script for "New Adam, New Eve" contains several sequences removed from the episode's final cut: (1) The fact that the Moon was 150,000 miles distant from New Earth; (2) A sequence of friendly banter where, after Verdeschi comments on the richness of New Earth's soil, Koenig would declare the planet to be as fertile as California was 150 years before. Verdeschi then compared it to Italy's Calabria of the present. Maya would joke about the bandits of the Calabrian hills, and Koenig would quip that all the Italian bandits went into politics in the 1980s. Verdeschi would then remind them all that Italian politics may not have been perfect, but it was an American who spoiled the United World movement in 1985; (3) When Carter made his first attempt to rescue Koenig in Eagle One, he would be accompanied by another pilot in Eagle Two; (4) The mutant reveals to Koenig that Magus was the last of his kind because his race had challenged a mysterious being more powerful than all of them combined. Magus was off travelling and survived. The real purpose of Magus's quest for a superior race was to do battle with this super-being.
 The mutant cave animals were scripted to be an enormous crustacean, a gigantic tarantula and a huge reptile. Visual effects supervisor Brian Johnson and the Bray Studios team hoped to achieve this vision using stop-motion animation, but this would have proved to be too costly and time-consuming. This resulted in a re-write where the creatures all became reptiles and realised with Komodo dragons.
 This episode debuted a revised version of Catherine Schell's Psychon make-up. ITC executives felt the brown-pigmented ears read on screen as 'dirty'. With her ears now left natural, the 'sideburn' cheekbone pigment would be made less prominent as well.  Hairdresser Jeannette Freeman would experiment with a new hairstyle for Schell, which was seen in this segment and early scenes of "The AB Chrysalis" before returning to her previous style.
 This episode also introduced Helena's hi-tech medical scanner—two small Perspex magnifying lenses which retracted into a small casing—with which she could scan or diagnose anything future scripts required (à la Dr. McCoy's whistling medical Feinberger on Star Trek). This would be the last time that the Eagle passenger module set would be seen with its eight-seat configuration.

Novelisation 

The episode was adapted in the first Year Two Space: 1999 novel Planets of Peril by Michael Butterworth published in 1977. The only difference from the finished episode was a reference that Maya was new to the position of scientific officer, as it was written to have taken place soon after "The Metamorph".

References

External links 
Space: 1999 - "New Adam, New Eve" - The Catacombs episode guide
Space: 1999 - "New Adam, New Eve" - Moonbase Alpha's Space 1999 page

1976 British television episodes
Space: 1999 episodes